Based in Toronto, Ontario, Canada, Raggedy Angry is a band that plays a mixture of synth and industrial rock music.

On October 1, 2010 via Synthetic Sounds and Danse Macabre the band released their third full-length album entitled How I Learned To Love Our Robot Overlords. The album featured production work from Dave "Rave" Ogilvie along with vocals from Jakalope lead singer Chrystal Leigh and Kevin James Maher of Fake Shark - Real Zombie!.

The band has played across Europe with The Birthday Massacre in addition to cross Canada with Die Mannequin.

Current members
Irvin Scabtree - Vocals
Paul Roussel - Drums
Brendan Bell - Guitars

Past members
Pressit - Guitars
Professor Oblivion - Bass
Air-Conditioned Superstar - Bass
C-Man - Bass

Discography
 Take Me, Break Me, Make Me Pretty (2006)
 Pestilence (2008)
 How I Learned To Love Our Robot Overlords (2010)
 Dead Beats (2012)
 Music appearance in Darknet (2013)

References

External links
Official Webpage
Official Myspace page
Official Facebook page

Canadian industrial music groups
Canadian electronic music groups
Musical groups established in 2006
Musical groups from Toronto
Metropolis Records artists
2006 establishments in Ontario